Anders Christian Holm (born May 29, 1981) is an American actor, comedian, writer, and producer. He is one of the stars and creators of the Comedy Central show Workaholics and starred in the short-lived NBC series Champions. He, along with fellow Workaholics creators Blake Anderson, Adam DeVine, and Kyle Newacheck, formed the sketch group Mail Order Comedy.

Early life and education
Holm was born the youngest of three boys on May 29, 1981, in Evanston, Illinois, His brothers are Olen (born 1975) and Erik (born 1976). He graduated from Evanston Township High School. In 2003, he graduated from the University of Wisconsin–Madison with a bachelor's degree in history. He was a member of the university's swim team. Holm studied at the Second City Conservatory in Los Angeles.

Career
Holm, along with fellow Workaholics creators Blake Anderson, Adam DeVine and Kyle Newacheck, formed the sketch comedy group Mail Order Comedy. He played a hip pastor who became the title character's fiancé in The Mindy Project. He also made a guest appearance in the fourth season of Modern Family in the episode "Flip Flop".

Holm made a guest appearance with fellow Workaholics actors Anderson, DeVine and Erik Griffin on the first episode of the fourth season of Arrested Development. He has also served as production and head writer's assistant for Real Time with Bill Maher before his work on Workaholics.

In 2014, Holm appeared in the Chris Rock-directed comedy film Top Five. Holm has also appeared in films involving Seth Rogen, such as a cameo in Neighbors, The Interview (both 2014), and Sausage Party (2016).

In 2016, he starred in the comedy film How to Be Single.

In 2018, he wrote, produced and acted in Game Over, Man! with Rogen as co-producer. The film was released on Netflix. Also that year, Holm also co-produced The Package, a Netflix original film comedy that premiered on August 10.

Personal life
Holm married his high school sweetheart, Emma Nesper Holm, in September 2011. Their first child was born in 2013.

Filmography

Film

Television

References

External links
 Official website of Mail Order Comedy

American male comedians
Living people
1981 births
Evanston Township High School alumni
Wisconsin Badgers men's swimmers
American male television actors
Male actors from Evanston, Illinois
American television writers
American male voice actors
American male television writers
American people of English descent
American people of Swiss-German descent
American people of Norwegian descent
American people of Swedish descent
21st-century American male actors
American male film actors
Writers from Evanston, Illinois
University of Wisconsin–Madison College of Letters and Science alumni
Comedians from Illinois
Screenwriters from Illinois
21st-century American comedians
21st-century American screenwriters
21st-century American male writers